This is a list of historic places in the City of Victoria, British Columbia entered on the Canadian Register of Historic Places, whether they are designated federally, provincially or municipally. For a list of historic places in the remainder of the Capital Regional District refer to the List of historic places in Capital Regional District.

 
Victoria